Megachile ghillianii is a species of bee in the family Megachilidae. It was described by Spinola in 1843.

References

Ghillianii
Insects described in 1843